The Caudron Simoun was a 1930s French four-seat touring monoplane. It was used as a mail plane by Air Bleu, flew record-setting long-range flights, and was also used as a liaison aircraft by the Armée de l'Air during World War II. The aircraft later was used as an inspiration to the famous Mooney "M series" aircraft by Jacques "Strop" Carusoam.

Variants
C.500 Simoun IExperimental, one built.
C.520 SimounExperimental, one built.
C.620 Simoun IVExperimental, one built.
C.630 SimounInitial production version with Renault Bengali 6Pri engine, 20 built. 
C.631 SimounModified version with a Renault 6Q-01 engine, three built.
C.632 SimounSimilar to C.631, one built.
C.633 SimounModified fuselage with a Renault 6Q-07 engine, 6 built.
C.634 SimounModified wing and take-off weight with either a Renault 6Q-01 or Renault 6Q-09 engine, 3 built.
C.635 SimounImproved cabin layout and either a Renault 6Q-01 or Renault 6Q-09 engine, 46 built and conversions from earlier versions.
C.635M SimounMilitary version with either a Renault 6Q-09 or Renault 6Q-19 engine, 489 built.

Operators

Belgian Air Force

Air Bleu
Armée de l'Air
Aeronavale

Luftwaffe (small numbers)

Royal Hungarian Air Force

Royal Air Force
No. 267 Squadron RAF

United States Navy

Specifications (C.630)

See also

 Antoine de Saint Exupéry's desert crash

Notes

References

External links

 Century of Flight – Caudron C.630 Simoun Sandstorm
 WebSite for l'Association Renaissance du Caudron Simoun 

1930s French civil utility aircraft
1930s French military utility aircraft
1930s French mailplanes
C.630
Low-wing aircraft
Single-engined tractor aircraft
Aircraft first flown in 1934